The initialism TDRI may refer to:
Thailand Development Research Institute
Total Drama: Revenge of the Island